The Hastings Football & Netball Club, nicknamed the Blues, is an Australian rules football and netball club based in Hastings, Victoria. The football squad plays in the Mornington Peninsula Nepean Football League (MPNFL) and has won 22 Senior Premierships since its first season in 1887.

At the end of the 2018 season, Hastings finished 6th with 10 wins and 8 losses. In the 2019 season, ex Carlton and Brisbane player Brendan Fevola will play for Hastings. He is expected to play against Tyabb in his debut match for the club.

Club Records
 Senior Premierships (22): 1901, 1904, 1905, 1906, 1907, 1908, 1909, 1910, 1912, 1913, 1914, 1934, 1946, 1947, 1948, 1972, 1975, 1976, 1977, 1992, 1995, 2016
 Highest Senior Score - 52.15.327 vs. Dromana (Round 13, 1929)
 Highest Win - 321 points vs. Dromana (Round 13, 1929)
 Highest Loss - 233 points vs. Mornington (Round 13, 1951)
 Most Senior Games - Peter Hibbert 342
 Most Senior Goals - Peter Hibbert 361

Senior League Best and Fairest Winners

AFL Players from Hastings

John Coleman
Peter Everitt
Herbert Francis
Len Incigneri
Laurie Rymer
Matthew Incigneri
Robert Stone
Pat Foy
Clem Splatt
Jack McMillan

References

External links
 Facebook page

Mornington Peninsula Nepean Football League
Australian rules football clubs in Victoria (Australia)
1889 establishments in Australia
Sports clubs established in 1889
Australian rules football clubs established in 1889
Netball teams in Victoria (Australia)
Sport in the Shire of Mornington Peninsula